The chapters of School Rumble are written and illustrated by Jin Kobayashi. The series is being serialized in Japan in Weekly Shōnen Magazine and has been collected into 22 bound novels by Kodansha. It has been licensed for an English-language release in the United States and Canada by Del Rey Manga, and in the United Kingdom by Tanoshimi.

The series was adapted into two 26-episode-long anime television series and two 2-episode-long original video animations (OVAs) by the Japanese animation studio Studio Comet, and the anime series were originally aired on TV Tokyo. The first anime and OVA series are each licensed for an English release in Australia and New Zealand by Madman Entertainment, in the United States and Canada by Funimation Entertainment, and in the United Kingdom by Revelation Films; the second anime series, School Rumble: Second Semester, has only been licensed for release in the United States by Funimation. The second OVA series has not yet been licensed in English.

In their English translation, Del Rey decided to leave names in Japanese order (family name, then given name) in order to better preserve the puns. This list presents names in Western order (given name, then family name). Individual chapters are called ♯ (musical sharps), with side stories called ♭ (musical flats).

Chapter list

School Rumble

School Rumble Z
Serialization of School Rumble Z began on August 20, 2008 and ended on May 20, 2009.

Chapters not yet in tankōbon format
♭♭01 What's up Doc (February 9, 2010)
Diamonds on the Inside (November 30, 2016)
Give it away (March 15, 2017)
We Are the Champions (November 8, 2017)

See also
List of School Rumble characters
List of School Rumble episodes

References

External links
Complete list of School Rumble media offered through Kodansha (lists DVDs, novels, etc. in addition to the manga) 

Chapters
School Rumble chapters